This is an index of agriculture topics.

A
Agricultural Machinery
Agricultural Science
Agronomy
Agroecology
Agricultural soil science
Agricultural engineering
Agriculture in Canada
Agricultural biotechnology
Apiculture

B
Biofertilizer
Biotechnology
Buckwheat
Biodynamic agriculture
Broadcast seeding

C
Cattle creep
Conventional tillage
Common Agricultural Policy
compost
Corn

E
Erosion
Entomology

F
Farm
Fertilizer
Food systems
Farming (disambiguation)
Food Security

G
Goat
Green Revolution
Green Revolution in India
Green Revolution (disambiguation)
Green Revolution (Iran)

H
Harrow (tool)
Hay
History of agriculture
Horticulture

L
List of agricultural universities and colleges
List of agriculture ministries

M
Maize
Minimum tillage
Ministry of Agriculture, Fisheries and Food (United Kingdom)

N
No-till farming
National Agricultural Law Center

O
Orchard
Organic farming
Optimum water content for tillage
Olericulture

P
Pig
Plant Breeding
Plant nutrition
Plough
Pomology

S
Selective breeding
Soil Science
Seed
Seed contamination
Seed treatment
Sheep
Silage
Shifting cultivation
Soil erosion

T
Theoretical production ecology
Tillage
Tillage Live
Tractor

U
Urban agriculture
United States National Agricultural Library

V

W
Weed
Weed control

Z
Zero tillage

See also
 Portal:Agropedia
 Agriculture

 
Agriculture